First Congregational Church and Parsonage is a historic church and parsonage site at 216–220 E. Gurley in Prescott, Arizona.

It was built in 1899 and added to the National Register in 1978.  The congregation was founded in 1880 and was the first in the Southwest Conference.  The congregation is currently affiliated with the United Church of Christ (UCC).

References

External links

 Official Websites

United Church of Christ churches in Arizona
Churches on the National Register of Historic Places in Arizona
Victorian architecture in Arizona
Romanesque Revival church buildings in Arizona
Churches completed in 1899
Buildings and structures in Prescott, Arizona
1899 establishments in Arizona Territory
National Register of Historic Places in Prescott, Arizona